G-Man Comics is a micro-publisher. It began on June 22, 2019 with the publication of the first comic book handbook in September 2019.

G-Man Comics is a guild-style publisher featuring Rik Offenberger's Simon N. Kirby, the Agent, Sgt. Flag, and Lynx; Jim Burrows' Demon Priest, Champion of Liberty², and Outrage; and Eric N. Bennett's American Eagle III, Blue Bolt, and Taranis. Although each creator owns exclusive rights to their creation, they occupy a shared universe.

Titles
 Black Phantom (Steve Perrin, Ronn Foss, John Jennings, Jim Burrows, Mell Ford, David Elis Leary) - ongoing
 Demon Priest Ashcan (Jim Burrows, Gilbert Monsanto) - (March 2020)
 G-Man Comics 3in1 (Rik Offenberger, Jim Burrows, Eric N. Bennett, Gilbert Monsanto, Alan Faria, Steven Butler, Michael Netzer, Bill Black, Eric Coile, Justin Vargas, Thomas Florimonte, Hique!, Téo Pinheiro) - ongoing
 G-Man Comics Christmas Special (Rik Offenberger, Steven Butler, Arnaldo dos Santos Ferreira Júnior, Joshua 1:9 Holley, Dean Juliette, Gilbert Monsanto, Bobby Ragland) - (December 2021 & December 2022)
 G-Man Comics Handbook (Rik Offenberger, Jim Burrows, Eric N. Bennett, Joe Sewell, Gilbert Monsanto, Phil Cho, Alan Faria)   - ongoing
 G-Men Undercover (Alan Faria, Arnaldo dos Santos Ferreira Júnior, Bill Black, Dærick Gröss Sr., Dean Juliette, Eric Coile, Fish Lee, Gilbert Monsanto, Joshua 1:9 Holley, Luis Rivera, Mike Gustovich, Rob Liefeld, Ron Frenz, Steven Butler)   - ongoing
 G-Men United (Rik Offenberger, Jim Burrows, Eric N. Bennett, Gilbert Monsanto, Bobby Ragland, David Ellis Leary, Earl Wajenberg, Fish Lee, Joshua 1:9 Holley,  Lou Mougin, Luis Rivera, Steven Butler, Thomas Florimonte)- ongoing
 Invictus: Outrage (Jim Burrows, Gilbert Monsanto, Arnaldo dos Santos Ferreira Júnior, Mel Ford, Steven Butler, Joshua 1:9 Holley) - ongoing
 Judah Maccabee (Rik Offenberger, ismail c. fentner, Gilbert Monsanto, Steven Butler) - (November 2021)
 Lynx (Rik Offenberger, Milton Estevam, Joshua 1:9 Holley, Mike Cody, Steven Butler, Mario Gully, Eric Shanower) - ongoing
 Sgt. Flag (Rik Offenberger, Gilbert Monsanto, Gregg Whitmore, Bobby Ragland, Luis Rivera, Joshua 1:9 Holley, Steven Butler, Mike Gustovich, Rob Liefeld) - ongoing
 Simon N. Kirby, The Agent (Rik Offenberger, Gilbert Monsanto, Alan Faria, Steven Butler, Mort Todd, Dærick Gröss Sr., Thomas Florimonte, Pat Broderick, Joshua 1:9 Holley) - ongoing
 Taranis, The Thunderlord (Eric N. Bennett, Arnaldo dos Santos Ferreira Júnior, Fernando Damasio, Ron Frenz, Joshua 1:9 Holley, Luis Rivera , Federico Pepito Sioc Jr., Ron Charles Williams, Andy Smith, Steven Butler) - ongoing
 Total Eclipse (Steve Perrin, Ronn Foss, Jim Burrows) - April 2023

Characters
 Agent Squires
 American Eagle III
 Atomik Bombshell
 Bella Donna
 Bette Noir
 Bette Noir (The Original)
 Blue Bolt
 Boden
 Celtic Gods
 Champion of Liberty²
 Dara
 Demon Priest
 Doc Ovalle
Druil
 Energist & Irene
 G-Men (Team)
 Judah "The Hammer" Maccabee
 Kid Terror
 Lynx
 Mummy Girl
 Pocahontas
 Red Halo
 Sgt. Flag
 Simon N. Kirby: The Agent
 Simone Lefort
 Sister Flag
 Tai-Chi Dragon
 Taranis
 Terror Noir
 True Blue & Richard, The True Knight
 Wildcard

References

External links

CBR Simon N. Kirby Suits Up in Agent Shield #1 and #2 Previews by Noah Dominguez
First Comics News G-Man Comics debuts Simon N. Kirby, The Agent
PREVIEWS WORLD'S The Scoop
Comic Chat Authority
My Big Fat Pull List
Jazma Online
Bleeding Cool
Comical Opinions

Publishing companies established in 2019
Privately held companies based in California
2019 establishments in California
Book publishing companies based in California
Superheroes